Archery at the 1920 Summer Olympics in Antwerp marked the return of the sport after a 12-year absence following it not being contested in the 1912 Summer Olympics and the cancellation of the 1916 Summer Olympics due to World War I.  The only competitors were men, and from only three countries.  Belgium sent 14 archers, while France and the Netherlands each sent 8.

Medal summary

Participating nations
A total of 30 archers from 3 nations competed at the Antwerp Games:

Medal table

References

Sources
 
 International Olympic Committee medal database

 
1920 Summer Olympics events
1920
1920 in archery